CPN Cudis is a British provider of electrical circuit protection components, such as distribution boards and consumer units. The business was founded in 2004.

The company's headquarters is in Bury, Greater Manchester, and employs approximately 20 staff.

CPN Cudis supply customers worldwide, but mainly operate in the UK and Europe. Their range of products includes consumer units, 3-phase distribution boards, surge protection devices, control gears, rotary isolators, auxiliaries, DOL starters and surge protection units.

'Lumo' consumer unit 
In October 2013, CPN Cudis released a LED consumer unit named 'Lumo'. The Lumo is made up of an industry standard certified consumer unit, but with the addition of a strip of LED lamps which are illuminated automatically when the cover of the unit is opened.

The Lumo is activated by a micro-switch and is powered by a standard battery. It is available currently in three sizes up to 22 ways. The unit was designed to solve the problem of having consumer units in darker locations, such as under stairs, and also to help aid those with vision problems, such as the elderly.

The Lumo was 'highly commended' at the 2013 Electrical Industry Awards.

Awards and nominations 

The Electrical Industry Awards

'Made in Bury' Business Awards

Sponsorships 
CPN Cudis and its sister company Rowe Hankins sponsored Bury Football Club for the 2014/2015 season.

CPN Cudis have sponsored Potton United FC since the 2017/2018 season.

References 

Companies based in Manchester